The Headquarters Administration Building of Big Basin Redwoods State Park, Santa Cruz County, California, was a historic structure built in 1936 by crews of the Civilian Conservation Corps.  It was built out of local materials (redwood logs and stone), and was one of the best-preserved examples of the CCC's work in the California state park system. The building continued to perform its original function, housing the park's administrative offices and serving as a contact point for park visitors, until it was destroyed by the wildfires sparked by the lightning storm of August 16, 2020. It was listed on the National Register of Historic Places in 2017.

See also
National Register of Historic Places listings in Santa Cruz County, California

References

History of Santa Cruz County, California
Park buildings and structures on the National Register of Historic Places in California
Houses completed in 1936
Houses in Santa Cruz County, California
Queen Anne architecture in California
National Register of Historic Places in Santa Cruz County, California
1936 establishments in California
National Park Service rustic in California